Borovsky or Borovskoy ( or ; masculine), Borovskaya (feminine), or Borovskoye (neuter) is the name of several inhabited localities in Russia.

Altai Krai
As of 2010, one rural locality in Altai Krai bears this name:
Borovskoye, Altai Krai, a selo in Borovskoy Selsoviet of Aleysky District

Arkhangelsk Oblast
As of 2010, two rural localities in Arkhangelsk Oblast bear this name:
Borovskaya, Nyandomsky District, Arkhangelsk Oblast, a village in Moshinsky Selsoviet of Nyandomsky District
Borovskaya, Shenkursky District, Arkhangelsk Oblast, a village in Mikhaylovsky Selsoviet of Shenkursky District

Belgorod Oblast
As of 2010, one rural locality in Belgorod Oblast bears this name:
Borovskoye, Belgorod Oblast, a selo in Shebekinsky District

Irkutsk Oblast
As of 2010, one rural locality in Irkutsk Oblast bears this name:
Borovskoy, Irkutsk Oblast, a settlement in Bratsky District

Kirov Oblast
As of 2010, one rural locality in Kirov Oblast bears this name:
Borovskaya, Kirov Oblast, a village in Luzyansky Rural Okrug of Darovskoy District

Komi Republic
As of 2010, one rural locality in the Komi Republic bears this name:
Borovskaya, Komi Republic, a village in Zamezhnaya selo Administrative Territory of Ust-Tsilemsky District

Kostroma Oblast
As of 2010, three rural localities in Kostroma Oblast bear this name:
Borovskoy, Pyshchugsky District, Kostroma Oblast, a settlement in Golovinskoye Settlement of Pyshchugsky District
Borovskoy, Sharyinsky District, Kostroma Oblast, a settlement in Shangskoye Settlement of Sharyinsky District
Borovskoye, Kostroma Oblast, a village in Orekhovskoye Settlement of Galichsky District

Kurgan Oblast
As of 2010, two rural localities in Kurgan Oblast bear this name:
Borovskoye, Belozersky District, Kurgan Oblast, a selo in Borovskoy Selsoviet of Belozersky District
Borovskoye, Kataysky District, Kurgan Oblast, a selo in Borovskoy Selsoviet of Kataysky District

Lipetsk Oblast
As of 2010, one rural locality in Lipetsk Oblast bears this name:
Borovskoye, Lipetsk Oblast, a selo in Tikhvinsky Selsoviet of Dobrinsky District

Nizhny Novgorod Oblast
As of 2010, one rural locality in Nizhny Novgorod Oblast bears this name:
Borovsky, Nizhny Novgorod Oblast, a cordon in Chashchikhinsky Selsoviet of Krasnobakovsky District

Novgorod Oblast
As of 2010, one rural locality in Novgorod Oblast bears this name:
Borovskoye, Novgorod Oblast, a village in Borovskoye Settlement of Khvoyninsky District

Orenburg Oblast
As of 2010, one rural locality in Orenburg Oblast bears this name:
Borovsky, Orenburg Oblast, a settlement in Troitsky Selsoviet of Buzuluksky District

Smolensk Oblast
As of 2010, one rural locality in Smolensk Oblast bears this name:
Borovskoye, Smolensk Oblast, a village in Leninskoye Rural Settlement of Pochinkovsky District

Sverdlovsk Oblast
As of 2010, two rural localities in Sverdlovsk Oblast bear this name:
Borovskoy, Artyomovsky District, Sverdlovsk Oblast, a settlement in Artyomovsky District
Borovskoy, Talitsky District, Sverdlovsk Oblast, a settlement in Talitsky District

Tver Oblast
As of 2010, two rural localities in Tver Oblast bear this name:
Borovskoye, Maksatikhinsky District, Tver Oblast, a village in Maksatikhinsky District
Borovskoye, Sandovsky District, Tver Oblast, a village in Sandovsky District

Tyumen Oblast
As of 2010, one urban locality in Tyumen Oblast bears this name:
Borovsky, Tyumen Oblast, a work settlement in Borovsky Rural Okrug of Tyumensky District

Vologda Oblast
As of 2010, one rural locality in Vologda Oblast bears this name:
Borovskaya, Vologda Oblast, a village in Olyushinsky Selsoviet of Verkhovazhsky District